The 2004 Jacksonville State Gamecocks football team represented Jacksonville State University as a member of the Ohio Valley Conference (OVC) during the 2005 NCAA Division I-AA football season. Led by Sixth-year head coach Jack Crowe, the Gamecocks compiled an overall record of 6–5 with a mark of 6–2 in conference play, finishing third in the OVC. Jacksonville State played home games at Paul Snow Stadium in Jacksonville, Alabama.

Schedule

References

Jacksonville State
Jacksonville State Gamecocks football seasons
Jacksonville State Gamecocks football